Francesco Argentino (c. 1450 –  23 August 1511) was an Italian Roman Catholic bishop and cardinal.

Biography
Francesco Argentino was born in Venice ca. 1450. His father was a poor man from Strasbourg (he took the surname "Argentino" because in Latin, "Strasbourg" is Argentinensis) and a Venetian woman. Giovanni Mocenigo, Doge of Venice, arranged for Argentino to study at the University of Padua, where the young man obtained a doctorate in law.

After completing his degree, he returned to Venice to practice law. Cardinal Giovanni di Lorenzo de' Medici (the future Pope Leo X) was exiled in Venice at that time, allowing Argentino to meet him. Thanks to the cardinal, he obtained a canonicate in the collegiate Chapter of St Mark's Basilica. In 1494, he became the pastor of Salzano.

He then traveled to Rome, where he gained the confidence of Cardinal Giuliano della Rovere (the future Pope Julius II). On August 24, 1506, he was elected Bishop of Concordia; he occupied that see until his death. When he became pope, Julius II made Bishop Argentino his Datary.

Pope Julius II made him a cardinal priest in the consistory of March 10, 1511. He received the red hat on March 13, 1511, and the titular church of the Basilica di San Clemente on March 17, 1511. He died in Rome on August 23, 1511. He was buried in Concordia Cathedral.

See also
Catholic Church in Italy

References

1511 deaths
16th-century Italian cardinals
Year of birth unknown
16th-century Roman Catholic bishops in the Republic of Venice
Year of birth uncertain